Aghacramphill is a townland in County Fermanagh, Northern Ireland. It is in the historic barony of Magherastephana and the civil parish of Aghalurcher and covers an area of 130 acres.

References

Townlands of County Fermanagh
Civil parish of Aghalurcher